Nong Bua may refer to:
Nong Bua District in Nakhon Sawan, Thailand
Nong Bua, Chiang Mai, subdistrict of Chai Prakan District, Chiang Mai, Thailand
Nong Bua railway station in Taling Chan Subdistrict, Saraburi City, Thailand
Nong Bua City F.C., football club in Nong Bua Lamphu, Thailand

See also 
Nong Bua Lamphu Province, Thailand
Nong Bua Daeng District in Chaiyaphum, Thailand
Nong Bua Rawe District in Chaiyaphum, Thailand
List of tambon in Thailand (N–O)